The Roman Catholic Archdiocese of Chinhoyi is a suffragan diocese in the city of Chinhoyi in the ecclesiastical province of Harare in Zimbabwe.

History
 December 17, 1973: Established as Apostolic Prefecture of Sinoia from Metropolitan Archdiocese of Salisbury
 June 25, 1982: Renamed as Apostolic Prefecture of Chinhoyi
 October 28, 1985: Promoted as Diocese of Chinhoyi

Leadership
 Prefect Apostolic of Chinhoyi (Roman rite) 
 Bishop Helmut Reckter, S.J. (22 Feb 1974  – 28 Oct 1985 see below)
 Bishops of Chinhoyi (Roman rite)
 Bishop Helmut Reckter, S.J. (see above 28 Oct 1985  – 10 Mar 2004)
 Bishop Dieter Scholz, S.J. (6 Apr 2006  – 17 Feb 2016)
 Bishop Raymond Tapiwa Mupandasekwa, C.Ss.R. (2017.13.30 -)

See also
Roman Catholicism in Zimbabwe

References

Sources
 GCatholic.org
 

Roman Catholic dioceses in Zimbabwe
Christian organizations established in 1973
Roman Catholic dioceses and prelatures established in the 20th century
Roman Catholic Ecclesiastical Province of Harare